Bramdean and Hinton Ampner is a civil parish in the English county of Hampshire forming part of the area administered as the City of Winchester.

References

Geography of Hampshire